The subclass Euechinoidea includes almost all living species of sea urchin, and fossil forms going back as far as the Triassic.

Taxonomy 
List of orders according to World Register of Marine Species : 
 Infra-classis Acroechinoidea
 Order Aspidodiadematoida
 Order Diadematoida
 Order Micropygoida
 Order Pedinoida
 Infra-classis Carinacea
 Super-order Calycina
 Order Phymosomatoida †
 Order Salenioida
 Super-order Echinacea
 Order Arbacioida
 Order Camarodonta
 Order Stomopneustoida
 Order  Echinothurioida
 Infra-classis  Irregularia
 Super-order  Atelostomata
 Order Holasteroida
 Order Spatangoida
 Order  Echinoneoida
 Order  Holectypoida †
 Super-order  Neognathostomata
 Order Cassiduloida
 Order Clypeasteroida
 Order Echinolampadoida
 Order Nucleolitidae †

Echinoidea
Extant Late Triassic first appearances
Taxa named by Heinrich Georg Bronn